Clavelina lepadiformis, common name the light-bulb sea squirt, is a colonial sea squirt native to the NE Atlantic Ocean.

Distribution
This species is a common shallow-water ascidian in Great Britain and Ireland. It occurs from Norway along European coasts south to the Mediterranean. In the Mediterranean the presence of cryptic species has been demonstrated.

Description
The transparent tunic and visible yellow or white internal organs give this animal its common name.

References

External links

Photos of Clavelina lepadiformis in the Sealife Collection

Enterogona
Animals described in 1776
Taxa named by Otto Friedrich Müller